National Tertiary Route 329, or just Route 329 (or ) is a National Road Route of Costa Rica, located in the San José province.

Description
In San José province the route covers Pérez Zeledón canton (Platanares, Pejibaye districts).

References

Highways in Costa Rica